Acherongia is a genus of springtails in the family Hypogastruridae. There are at least four described species in Acherongia.

Species
These four species belong to the genus Acherongia:
 Acherongia huetheri Fjellberg, 1992 i c g
 Acherongia minima Massoud & Thibaud, 1985 i c g
 Acherongia palatinensis (Hüther, 1969) i c g
 Acherongia steineri Christian & Thibaud, 1996 i c g
Data sources: i = ITIS, c = Catalogue of Life, g = GBIF, b = Bugguide.net

References

Further reading

 
 
 

Poduromorpha
Springtail genera